Claude Lanzmann: Spectres of the Shoah is a 2015 documentary-short film exploring the life and work of French director Claude Lanzmann. The film was written, directed, and produced by British filmmaker and journalist Adam Benzine.

Production background
The documentary explores the 12-year journey undertaken by Lanzmann to make his 1985 film Shoah, a nine-and-a-half-hour-long documentary about the Holocaust. In Spectres of the Shoah, Lanzmann details the practical and emotional challenges he faced from 1973–85, explaining his efforts to convince traumatized death camp survivors to recount their Second World War experiences; the dangers he faced in tracking down and secretly filming SS Officers illegally; his own teenage years spent fighting in the French Resistance; his romance with Simone de Beauvoir and friendship with Jean-Paul Sartre; as well as his difficulties in composing into a single cohesive narrative more than 200 hours of material he collected.

In making the short documentary, Benzine and his team worked with the United States Holocaust Memorial Museum to secure a wide range of previously unseen outtake material, which was originally filmed during the making of Shoah, in order to help tell Lanzmann's personal story.

Release
Claude Lanzmann: Spectres of the Shoah had its world premiere on April 25, 2015, almost 30 years to the day that Shoah was released, at the Hot Docs film festival in Toronto, Canada, where it won an Honourable Mention in the Best Mid-Length Documentary Competition.

During the festival, U.S. premium cable network HBO acquired the American TV rights to the film. Sheffield Doc/Fest hosted the European Premiere of the film in June 2015, and the San Francisco Jewish Film Festival hosted the U.S. festival premiere for the film on July 28, at the Castro Theater in San Francisco.

The film continued its festival run throughout the fall of 2015 with its London premiere at the UK Jewish Film Festival, and international screenings at the Camden International Film Festival, the Hamptons International Film Festival, the Vienna International Film Festival, the Hot Springs Documentary Film Festival, the Vancouver Jewish Film Festival, DOC NYC in New York, and IDFA in Amsterdam.

Franco-German broadcaster ARTE broadcast the doc on January 27, 2016, as did the CBC's Documentary Channel in Canada and SVT in Sweden, while HBO broadcast the U.S. premiere of the film on May 2 of the same year. Danish broadcaster DR, which along with ZDF/ARTE was an early investor in the film, will broadcast it in 2017.

Claude Lanzmann was the first motion picture to be released as a non-fungible token (NFT) on March 15, 2021. Ten 'first edition' tokens were offered for auction via the blockchain auction site Rarible.

Reception
The film has met with widespread critical acclaim as it has played at film festivals, theatrically and on television. The Toronto Star described the film as "a stunning revelation to both people who have seen Shoah and people who have not" in its Hot Docs review, while the San Francisco Chronicle described it as "fascinating." In a four-star review, NOW billed the film as "an essential supplement to one of the most important documentaries ever made," while The Globe and Mail rated the doc 3.5 out of 4, saying it was both "fascinating and upsetting."

Awards and nominations

References

External links

The documentary's Facebook page
The documentary's Twitter page

2015 films
2015 short documentary films
2010s French-language films
Documentary films about the Holocaust
Documentary films about World War II
Documentary films about film directors and producers